Auburn Community Mausoleum is a historic mausoleum located in Roselawn Cemetery at Auburn, DeKalb County, Indiana.  It was built in 1917, and is a one-story, monolithic cubic limestone structure with simple Classical Revival style detail.  It features a shallow porch with two Doric order columns.  The mausoleum continued to be used for interments into the 1960s.

It was added to the National Register of Historic Places in 2014.

References

Monuments and memorials on the National Register of Historic Places in Indiana
Mausoleums on the National Register of Historic Places
Neoclassical architecture in Indiana
Buildings and structures completed in 1917
Buildings and structures in DeKalb County, Indiana
National Register of Historic Places in DeKalb County, Indiana
1917 establishments in Indiana
Death in Indiana